The Kosmos-3 (GRAU Index: 11K65, also known as Cosmos-3) was a Soviet carrier rocket (Kosmos (rocket family)), derived from the R-14 missile, which was used to orbit satellites between 1966 and 1968. It was quickly replaced by the modernised Kosmos-3M. Six were flown, four as orbital carrier rockets, and two on sub-orbital flights. All launches occurred from Site 41/15 at the Baikonur Cosmodrome.

The Kosmos-3 made its maiden flight on 16 November 1966, carrying a Strela-2 satellite. Strela-2 satellites were flown on four flights, two of which failed. Two further, sub-orbital launches were conducted with VKZ payloads, both of which were successful.

Launch history

See also
Kosmos-1
Kosmos-2I
Kosmos-3M

References

Space launch vehicles of the Soviet Union